The 1949 Summer Deaflympics officially known as the 6th Deaf Olympiadis an international multi-sport event that was held from 12 August 1949 to 16 August 1949. This event was hosted in Copenhagen, Denmark.

This Deaflympics was held after 10 years since the last edition of the Deaflympics(1939) due to World War II.

Basketball and water polo were added as events for the first time in Deaflympics history.

Participating Countries
The following countries participated in the 1949 Deaflympics:
 Austria
 Belgium
 Czechoslovakia
 Denmark
 Finland
 France
 Great Britain
 Italy
 Netherlands
 Norway
 Sweden
 Switzerland
 United States of America
 Yugoslavia

Sports

Individual sports 
  Athletics
  Cycling
  Diving
  Shooting
  Swimming
  Tennis
  Water polo

Team sports 
  Basketball
  Football

Medal table

Results

Athletics

Basketball

Cycling

Diving

Football

Shooting

List of sports
 100m Men
 100m Women
 200m
 400m 
 800m
 1500m
 5000m
 10000m
 110m Hurdles
 400m Hurdles
 High Jump Men
 High Jump Women 
 Pole Vault
 Long Jump Men
 Long Jump Women
 Triple Jump
 Shot Put Men
 Shot Put Women
 Discus Throw
 Javelin Throw
 4X100m Relay Men
 4X100m Relay Women
 4X400m Relay
 Olympic Relay
 Basketball
 Cycling- Road Individual
 Diving 3m Springboard
 Football
 Shooting Army Rifle 300m
 Shooting Team Classification
 Shooting Army Rifle 200m
 Swimming 100m FreestyleMen
 Swimming 100m Freestyle Women
 Swimming 200m Freestyle Women
 Swimming 400m Freestyle Men
 Swimming 400m Freestyle Women
 Swimming 1500m Freestyle
 Swimming 100m Backstroke Men
 Swimming 100m Backstroke Women
 Swimming 200m Breaststroke Men
 Swimming 200m Breaststroke Women
 Swimming  Freestyle Relay Men
 Swimming 4X50m Freestyle Relay Women
 Swimming 3x100m Medley Men
 Swimming 3x50m Medley Women
 Tennis Singles Men 
 Tennis Singles Women
 Tennis Doubles Men 
 Tennis Doubles Women 
 Tennis Mixed Doubles
Water Polo

Notes

References 

Deaflympics
International sports competitions in Copenhagen
Deaflympics, 1949
Deaflympics
Deaflympics